Yardley Gobion is a village in the south of the English county of Northamptonshire off a by-pass of the A508 Northampton to Milton Keynes road.

The village's name means 'rod wood/clearing', where they were made or acquired. Henry Gubyun held land in the village in 1228.

Governance
It has a parish council with 11 members

Facilities
The Grand Union Canal runs nearby east of the village.

In 1979 it featured on the Blue Peter television series when presenter Simon Groom visited a breeder of St Bernards in the village.

The noted Victorian botanist George Claridge Druce, later Mayor of Oxford, went to school in the village.

References

External links

Yardley Gobion Parish Council.
Website of the village's primary school
War Memorial details
1st Yardley Gobion Scout Group
History of Yardley Gobion
A Short Aerial Video of Yardley Gobion - Jan 2015

Villages in Northamptonshire
Civil parishes in Northamptonshire
West Northamptonshire District